Tilt O'Whirl is the title of Veal's second album. The album was released in 1999 in Canada.

Track listing 
"Spiderman" (4:13)
"Skid" (3:21)
"Peroxide" (3:55)
"Harold's End" (5:45)
"Graduation" (2:43)
"Happy as Pye" (4:37)
"Pinkos" (4:18)
"Buttercloud" (3:25)
"Monkey Tree" (3:19)
"Po Black Child" (4:13)
"Centre of the Universe" (3:18)
"Underground" (1:18)
"Weary Head" (5:19)

Album personnel

Veal
 Luke Doucet - 
 Howard Redekopp - bass guitar, vocals

Additional personnel

Production
 Michael Phillip Wojewoda - producer
 Veal - producer
 Howard Redekopp - engineer

1999 albums
Veal (band) albums
Six Shooter Records albums
Albums produced by Michael Phillip Wojewoda